The following is a list of international rankings of .

Communications

Mobile Telephony Market Penetration (Pyramid Research, OECD, national regulatory agencies): in 2008, ranked 2 among the top 10 countries

Demographics

Population ranked 74 out of 228 countries and territories
World Health Organization 2011 estimates Life expectancy ranked 17 out of 193 UN member states
 Population Density: in 2010 ranked 111 out of 235 countries

Economic

World Economic Forum Global Competitiveness Report 2014–2015 ranked 81 out of 144
United Nations Development Programme 2014 Human Development Index ranked 29 out of 187

Environment

The Earth Institute and Yale Center for Environmental Law & Policy   Environmental Performance Index 2014, ranked 23 out of 146 countries

Geography

 Total area ranked 97 out of 249 countries
 Total coastline ranked 19 out of 148 not landlocked countries, with 15,147 km of coastline according to World Resources Institute

Globalization
KOF Index of Globalization 2014 ranked 23 out of 60 countries
A.T. Kearney/Foreign Policy Magazine: Globalization Index 2006, ranked 32 out of 62 countries

Health
Physicians per 1000 population (OECD):  2007, ranked 1 out of 30 countries
The World Health Organization's ranking of the world's health systems:  2000, ranked 14 out of 190 countries
Preventable deaths (Health Affairs):  2008, ranked 7 out of 14 countries

Industry
OICA automobile production 2007, not ranked among top 51 countries

Military

Center for Strategic and International Studies: active troops ranked 29 out of 166 countries

Political

 Transparency International: Corruption Perceptions Index 2015, ranked 58 out of 175 countries
 Reporters Without Borders 2015 Press Freedom Index, ranked 91 out of 180 countries
The Economist Intelligence Unit Democracy Index 2014, ranked 41 out of 167 countries

Society

 Economist Intelligence Unit  Where-to-be-born Index 2013, ranked 34 out of 80 countries
 United Nations: Human Development Index 2014, ranked 29 out of 187 countries
 Save the Children: State of the World's Mothers report 2007, ranked 23 out of 110 countries
World Health Organization: suicide rate, ranked 34 out of the 34 OECD countries

Technology
Brown University Taubman Center for Public Policy 2006: ranked 86 in online government services
Number of broadband Internet users ranked 36
Economist Intelligence Unit: E-readiness 2008, ranked 30 out of 45 countries
World Economic Forum Networked Readiness Index 2007–2008, ranked 56 out of 127 countries

Tourism

World Tourism Organization: World Tourism rankings 2007, ranked 16

Transportation

Total rapid transit systems ranked 23

Historical data

See also
Lists of countries
Lists by country
List of international rankings

References

Greece